The Beni Ali massacre took place in the mountain hamlet of Beni Ali,  south of Algiers near Chrea, on 26 August 1997. Sixty-four (according to The New York Times and CNN) or 100 people (according to Amnesty International) were killed in a terrorist attack. Three days later came the larger Rais massacre.

See also
List of massacres in Algeria

References

External links
Amnesty International
CNN

Algerian massacres of the 1990s
1997 in Algeria
Conflicts in 1997
Massacres in 1997
August 1997 events in Africa